We're All Great Directors is an album by Zhao Wei. It marks the release of the second album by independent music studio MBOX. This album online digital download was released on 7 August 2009.

Track listing

Awards and nominations
CCTV-MTV Music Awards
Nominated: Best Female Vocal Performance
Nominated: Favorite Female Artist

15th Channel[V] Globe Music Chart Awards
Nominated: Best Female Vocal Performance
Nominated: Favorite Female Artist

Music Radio Top Chart Awards
Nominated: Favorite Female Artist

External links
Sina.com Official Page
QQ.com Official Page

References

2009 albums
Zhao Wei albums